Harpenden railway station is on the Midland Main Line in England, serving the town of Harpenden, Hertfordshire. Its three-letter station code is HPD.

The station is served by Govia Thameslink-operated trains on the Thameslink route.

History
Harpenden was the second station built in the town, by the Midland Railway in 1868 on its extension to St. Pancras. Nothing remains of the original station buildings. Although located on Station Road, the road is actually named after the first station, which was built in 1860 and closed in 1965.

A branch line, built by the Hemel Hempstead Railway Company in 1877, known as the Nickey Line but operated by the Midland, formerly diverged from the main line north of the station. The intention had been to meet the LNWR at Boxmoor, but the section from Hemel Hempstead never had a passenger service. In 1886, a south curve was added to the junction allowing passengers to join the London trains at Harpenden rather than Luton. The branch was closed in 1979, but the route remains in use as a cycleway, passing under the M1 in a tunnel.

A row of five brick built former coal merchant's offices along the station approach are now used as small retail and office units.

Stationmasters
Alfred King, station master from 1920 to 1927, committed suicide at age 53 on 29 March 1927 by lying on the rails in front of an express train. The inquest found that he had been suffering from depression and delusions for a long time.

Joseph Vizall Bendall 1870 - 1872 (formerly station master at Ketton, afterwards station master at Cheltenham)
George Salmon 1872 - 1899 (formerly station master at Irchester)
Horace E. Horne 1899 - 1907 (afterwards station master at Cheltenham)
E. Jones 1907 - 1920  (formerly station master at Higham Ferrers, afterwards station master at St Albans)
Alfred John King 1920 - 1927 (formerly station master at Raunds and Olney)
E. Goode until 1932
F.C. Cooper 1932 - 1942 (afterwards station master at Bath)

Facilities
The station has facilities toilets, a newsagent, dry cleaner, taxi office and rank, and a coffee shop.

The station also has ticket machines on both sides of the station.

The station has a PlusBus scheme where train and bus tickets can be bought together for a cheaper price.

All four platforms have been extended to support 12-carriage trains, as part of the Thameslink programme; this also required the widening of a road bridge. Work on these started on 21 November 2010 and was completed in May 2011. The construction of a new footbridge, with lifts for disabled access, has been completed and links up all four platforms. and The east side of the station (platform 1 side) has two entrances, both with ticket gates to ease congestion during peak times. The west side entrance is where the ticket office is located, but it also has ticket machines.

An extra deck of parking spaces is planned to be built on top of the existing east side car park. When completed, it will add an extra 200 parking spaces.

Services

Service History

2006/07 services
The typical off-peak service pattern saw six trains per hour in each direction, operated by First Capital Connect.

December 2007

East Midlands Railway operates trains on the Midland Main Line route from St Pancras International to/from Leeds, Sheffield, Derby, Nottingham and Leicester through the station, but do not stop. Interchange with these trains can be made one or two stops to the north, either at Luton or Luton Airport Parkway, dependent on the service.

2009
From March 2009, First Capital Connect, in partnership with Southeastern, began running a Luton-Sevenoaks service, which called at Harpenden.

Current Services
All services at Harpenden are operated by Thameslink using  EMUs.

The typical off-peak service in trains per hour is:
 2 tph to 
 2 tph to Three Bridges via 
 2 tph to  via 

Gallery

References

Sources

External links

Railway stations in Hertfordshire
DfT Category D stations
Former Midland Railway stations
Railway stations in Great Britain opened in 1868
Railway stations served by Govia Thameslink Railway
Harpenden